Saumalkol, known as Volodarskoye until 1997, is a settlement and the administrative center of Aiyrtau District in North Kazakhstan Region of Kazakhstan. It is the head of the Volodar rural district (KATO code - 593230100). Population:

Geography

References

Populated places in North Kazakhstan Region

ru:Саумалколь (село)